Ieva Rudzīte (born 15 August 1989 in Riga) is a Latvian curler.

At the national level, she is a two-time Latvian women's champion (2017, 2018) and a two-time mixed doubles champion (2015, 2021).

Teams

Women's

Mixed

Mixed doubles

References

External links

 
 Video: 

Living people
1989 births
Sportspeople from Riga
Latvian female curlers
Latvian curling champions
21st-century Latvian women